Can Seo is a television series teaching Scottish Gaelic that initially started broadcasting in 1979 on BBC1 Scotland. The television series lasted for 20 weeks. Additionally, a textbook, cassette and vinyl LP were produced to accompany the series. 'Can Seo' means 'Say This' in Scottish Gaelic.

See also
Speaking our Language – a series teaching Gaelic, produced by STV in the 1990s.

BBC Scotland television shows
Scottish Gaelic education
Language education television series
1979 Scottish television series debuts
1970s Scottish television series
1979 Scottish television series endings